The Battle of Stalingrad (1942–1943), a battle on the Eastern Front of World War II, often regarded as the single largest and bloodiest battle in the history of warfare, and one of the most decisive battles of World War II, has inspired a number of media works.

Films

Documentary films
 Stalingrad (1943), a Soviet film shot during the battle
 The Great Battle on the Volga (Velikaya bitva na Volge), using archive footage taken by 150 Soviet cameramen during the battle, released in 1962
  (June 1942 – February 1943)

Fiction films
 The Battle of Stalingrad (Сталинградская битва), a 1949 two-part Soviet movie
 Soldiers (Солдаты), a 1958 Soviet movie based on novel by Russian writer and participant of Stalingrad battle Viktor Nekrasov
 Stalingrad: Dogs, Do You Want to Live Forever? (Hunde, wollt ihr ewig leben?), a 1958 West German film directed by Frank Wisbar
 Hot Snow a 1972 Soviet film about Soviet artillery during Operation Winter Storm
 Stalingrad, a 1989 two-part film directed by Yuri Ozerov.
 Stalingrad, a 1993 German film directed by Joseph Vilsmaier
 Enemy at the Gates, a 2001 Franco-British film which dramatized and in some cases fictionalized elements of real exploits by sniper Vasily Zaytsev. Directed by Jean-Jacques Annaud and starring Jude Law, Joseph Fiennes, Ed Harris and Rachel Weisz
 Stalingrad (2013), a Russian film that tells the story of six Soviet reconnaissance troops and their part in the battle, holding a building along with various units to defend Stalingrad and Volga River from German attacks

Games

Board games
Stalingrad (1963), Avalon Hill
Streets of Stalingrad (1979), Phoenix Games
Turning Point: Stalingrad (1989), Avalon Hill
Red Barricades: ASL Historical Module 1 (1990), Avalon Hill

Video games
The Stalingrad Campaign (1986)
Commandos 3: Destination Berlin (2003) portrayed the battle in the Stalingrad campaign
Call of Duty (2003) famous moments such as crossing of the Volga and the battle for Pavlov's House are depicted in the Soviet campaign
Stalingrad (2005)
Call of Duty 2 (2005)
Call of Duty: World at War (2008) portrayed the battle in the first mission of the Soviet campaign, Vendetta, as well as the multiplayer map Revolution.
Red Orchestra 2: Heroes of Stalingrad (2011), the single player campaign focuses on the Battle of Stalingrad, and several maps in the game portray famous locations of the battle, such as Pavlov's House, the Red October Factory and Mamayev Kurgan, among others. The Multiplayer also consisted of several famous locations from the single player so people could experience for themselves what it was like, to an extent.
Company of Heroes 2 (2013) portrayed the battle in certain missions, but was heavily criticized by some Russian players for "being historically inaccurate", and on 7 August DVD sales of the Russian version of the game were halted in Russia, while the game is still available for downloading from Steam.
IL-2 Sturmovik: Battle of Stalingrad (2013)

Literature

Fiction
  A novel written by one of the most celebrated reporters in the Red Army.
  A prequel to Life and Fate, published earlier in Russia.  This is the first comprehensive translation into English.
  A 1957 German novel written by a Stalingrad veteran and translated into English in 2018. Gerlach wrote another version of this novel in 1945, which was confiscated by the Soviets, and found in Russian state archives in 2012.
  A novel focused on a German doctor in Stalingrad. Adapted for the film The Doctor of Stalingrad (1958).
   A fictional story of a former SS officer, the third chapter ("Courante") takes place in Stalingrad.  The book received two major French literary awards (the Grand Prix du roman de l'Académie française and the Prix Goncourt).
  A pseudo-memoir novel.
  A novel which was later adapted for the film Enemy at the Gates (2001).
  A postmodern novel that received the 2005 National Book Award.
  A novel focused on a German tank officer, a Russian sniper, and a child living in Stalingrad. Received the White Pine Award.

Non-fiction
 Michael K. Jones - Stalingrad: How the Red Army Triumphed. Pen & Sword Military, 19 April 2007
 Antony Beevor - Stalingrad: The Fateful Siege, 1942-1943. New York: Viking, 1998. An overall perspective of the battle. Noted for its extensive use of first-hand accounts.
 Viktor Nekrasov - In trenches of Stalingrad (Виктор Некрасов "В окопах Сталинграда")
 Last Letters from Stalingrad (German: Letzte Briefe aus Stalingrad), an anthology of letters from German soldiers who took part in the Battle for Stalingrad during World War II. Originally published in West Germany in 1950, the book was translated into many languages (into English by Anthony G. Powell in 1956), and has been issued in numerous editions.
 Glantz, David M. & House, Jonathan (1995), When Titans Clashed: How the Red Army Stopped Hitler, Lawrence, Kansas: University Press of Kansas, 
 Glantz, David M. & House, Jonathan (2009), To the Gates of Stalingrad – Soviet-German combat operations April to August 1942, (Kansas UP) 
 Glantz, David M. & House, Jonathan (2009), Armageddon in Stalingrad – September to November 1942, (Kansas UP), 
 Glantz, David M. & House, Jonathan (2014), Endgame at Stalingrad - Book One: November 1942, (Kansas UP), 
 Glantz, David M. & House, Jonathan (2014), Endgame at Stalingrad - Book Two: December 1942 - January 1943, (Kansas UP), 
 Glantz, David (2011), 'After Stalingrad: The Red Army's Winter Offensive 1942–1943', Helion and Company,

Poetry

Concert music 
 a chamber music piece based on the 1950 book of the same name
 A collage of music and recitation based on the book Last Letters from Stalingrad (1950)

Stage productions 

 The play Stalingrad 1942 was presented by Theatre Formation Paribartak of India in 2006

Medal art 
1985 table medal issued for the 40th anniversary of victory in the Great Patriotic War. The obverse of the medal depicts a battle scene in Stalingrad with the fire-rescue boat Gasitel in the foreground and burning Stalingrad in the background. On the reverse of the medal there is the inscription "40 years of the victory of the Soviet people in the Great Patriotic War". The medal was made by casting zinc alloy. It has a diameter of 98 mm and a weight of 450 g.

References

World War II and the media
Works about the Battle of Stalingrad
Stalingrad